Bethlehem Baptist Cemetery is located in Utica, Daviess County, Kentucky, United States. It contains over 100 graves. It was properly made in the early 1800s because the earliest known person to be buried there was in 1820. On May 14 2018 heavy snowfall causing half the 100-year-old church building to collapse, the building was later demolished.

References

External links
 

Cemeteries in Kentucky
Buildings and structures in Daviess County, Kentucky